Næsheim is a Norwegian surname. Notable people with the surname include:

Alf Næsheim (1926–2014), Norwegian painter and illustrator
Peder P. Næsheim (1925–1969), Norwegian politician

Norwegian-language surnames